is an airline headquartered in Naha, Okinawa Prefecture, Japan. It operates domestic passenger services from the island of Okinawa to other islands of Okinawa Prefecture and the Amami Islands, Kagoshima Prefecture.

History

The airline was established in 1985 and started operations on 17 February 1985. It is owned by Japan Transocean Air (72.9%), other shareholders (22.0%) and Okinawa Prefecture (5.1%). In 2015, the airline signed a firm purchase agreement for five Bombardier Dash 8-Q400 passenger/cargo combi aircraft, following the signing of a Memorandum of Understanding in 2014. It will be the launch customer for this new variant aircraft. The final Bombardier Dash 8-Q300 flight was on 31 January 2018.

Destinations
Scheduled destinations (as of November 2019):

Fleet

Current fleet

The Ryukyu Air Commuter fleet consists of the following aircraft (as of August 2019):

Former fleet
The airline previously operated the following aircraft:
1 Bombardier Dash 8-100
1 Bombardier Dash 8-Q300
1 Britten-Norman BN-2 Islander

References

External links

RAC official web site (Japanese)

Regional airlines of Japan
Japan Airlines
Airlines established in 1985
Companies based in Okinawa Prefecture
Japanese companies established in 1985